Y. gracilis may refer to:
 Yochelcionella gracilis, a mollusc species from the lower Cambrian of North America in the genus Yochelcionella
 Youngia gracilis, a plant species in the genus Youngia

See also
 Gracilis (disambiguation)